The 2009/10 NTFL season was the 89th season of the Northern Territory Football League (NTFL).

The Grand Final was played on Saturday 13 March 2010. St Marys won the title by 10 points over an upset victory against the minor premiers,  Tiwi Bombers.

Grand Final

References

Northern Territory Football League seasons
NTFL